Jê or Gê may refer to:
Jê languages
Jê peoples